Paul Gallo (born February 24, 1953) is an American theatrical lighting designer.

In a career that spans over 4 decades, Gallo has designed over 52 Broadway productions, an achievement matched by only 8 other lighting designers.  He made his Broadway debut at the age of 27 with Passione, starring Jerry Stiller.

Gallo has received eight nominations for the Tony Award for Best Lighting Design and ten nominations for the Drama Desk Award for Outstanding Lighting Design, which he won for the 1992 revival of Guys and Dolls. He won the Henry Hewes Design Award, Collaborative Design Achievement-Lighting Design for the Public Theater production of Vienna: Lusthaus in 1986, and was nominated for Hewes Design Award, Lighting Design, for The Crucible (2002).

Biography 
Gallo was born in New York City near Arthur Avenue in the Bronx, the son of Lola (Morales) Gallo and Albert Gallo who were ballroom dancers in the 1950s. Gallo attended Ithaca College on an acting scholarship but soon discovered his aptitude for lighting. He then went on to study lighting with Tom Skelton and Ming Cho Lee as a graduate of the Yale School of Drama.

Original Broadway Productions (selected)
 Grown Ups (1981)
 Beyond Therapy (1982)
 Come Back To The Five And Dime, Jimmy Dean, Jimmy Dean (1982)
 The Mystery of Edwin Drood (1985)
 The House of Blue Leaves (1986)
 Smile (1986)
 City of Angels (1989)
 Lend Me a Tenor (1989)
 Six Degrees of Separation (1990)
 I Hate Hamlet (1991)
 Crazy for You (1992)
 Smokey Joe's Cafe (1995)
 Titanic (1997)
 Triumph of Love (1997)
 The Civil War (1999)
 Three Days of Rain (2006)
 A Bronx Tale (2007)
 Mauritius (2007)
 November (2008)
 Wonderland (2011)
 Three Tall Women (2018)

Celebrated Revivals on Broadway (selected)
 Anything Goes (1987)
 Guys and Dolls (1992)
 A Funny Thing Happened On The Way To The Forum (1996)
 The Sound Of Music (1998)
 The Rocky Horror Show (2000)
 42nd Street (2001)
 Man Of La Mancha (2002)
 The Crucible (2002)
 Pal Joey (2008)

Film Lighting
 O.C. and Stiggs (1985)
 The Comedy Of Errors (1987)
 The Man Who Came To Dinner (2000)
 Chicago (2002)
 "The Marvelous Mrs. Maisel" - S3, Ep 8 & 9 (2019)

Tony Award nominations 
for Best Lighting Design:
1986 The House of Blue Leaves
1988 Anything Goes
1990 City of Angels
1992 Crazy for You
1992 Guys and Dolls
2001 42nd Street
2002 The Crucible
2006 Three Days of Rain

References

External links
Paul Gallo Studio

Paul Gallo Internet Off-Broadway Database listing
Raising Titanic: Paul Gallo and his design team position the ship for its Broadway Berth

American lighting designers
Drama Desk Award winners
Yale School of Drama alumni
People from the Bronx
Living people
1953 births